The gecos field, or GECOS field is a field in each record in the /etc/passwd file on Unix and similar operating systems. On UNIX, it is the 5th of 7 fields in a record.

It is typically used to record general information about the account or its user(s) such as their real name and phone number.

Format
The typical format for the GECOS field is a comma-delimited list with this order:
User's full name (or application name, if the account is for a program)
Building and room number or contact person
Office telephone number
Home telephone number
Any other contact information (pager number, fax, external e-mail address, etc.)
In most UNIX systems non-root users can change their own information using the chfn or chsh command.

History
Some early Unix systems at Bell Labs used GECOS machines for print spooling and various other services, so this field was added to carry information on a user's GECOS identity.

Other uses
On Internet Relay Chat (IRC), the real name field is sometimes referred to as the gecos field. IRC clients are required to supply this field when connecting. Hexchat, an X-Chat fork, defaults to 'realname', TalkSoup.app on GNUstep defaults to 'John Doe', and irssi reads the operating system user's full name, replacing it with 'unknown' if not defined. Some IRC clients use this field for advertising; for example, ZNC defaulted to "Got ZNC?", but changed it to "RealName   = " to match its configuration syntax in 2015.

See also
General Comprehensive Operating System

References

Unix